This list of Living National Treasures of Japan (crafts) contains all the individuals and groups certified as Living National Treasures by the Ministry of Education, Culture, Sports, Science and Technology of the government of Japan in the category of the .

Crafts are divided into eight categories: pottery, textiles, lacquerware, metalworking, dollmaking, woodworking, papermaking, and other. The categories are subdivided into a number of more specific subcategories.

Those working in crafts are eligible for recognition either individually (Individual Certification) or as part of a group (Preservation Group Certification).

List of current designated individuals (crafts)

Pottery

Textiles

Lacquerware

Metalworking

Dollmaking

Woodworking

Papermaking

List of past designated individuals (crafts)

Pottery

Textiles

Lacquerware

Metalworking

Dollmaking

Woodworking

Other

Papermaking

List of Designated Groups (Crafts)

See also
Living National Treasures of Japan
List of Living National Treasures of Japan (performing arts)
List of National Treasures of Japan

References

Kodansha, 
Ministry of Cultural Affairs National Cultural Properties Database
'重要無形文化財の指定・認定について,' Ministry of Cultural Affairs, 16 July 2010 

 
Japanese crafts
Lists of artists